Greg Holland may refer to:

 Greg Holland (musician) (born 1967), American country musician
 Greg Holland (born 1985), American  baseball pitcher
 Greg Holland (meteorologist) (born 1948), Australian tropical cyclone researcher